Braughing Friars is a hamlet in Hertfordshire, England. It is in the civil parish of Braughing.

External links

Hamlets in Hertfordshire
Braughing